Children's Health Ireland (CHI; , SLÉ) is a statutory body established in 2018 to oversee the development and governance of specialist acute paediatric hospital services in Ireland. The name "Phoenix Children's Health" had originally been announced for this entity in 2017, but that name was abandoned following legal action from Phoenix Children's Hospital.

On 1 January 2019, CHI took over governance of the three tertiary children's hospitals in Dublin (Our Lady's Children's Hospital, Crumlin, Temple Street Children's University Hospital, and the National Children's Hospital). In doing so, it succeeded the Children's Hospital Group, which had previously been formed in August 2013 with a view to integrating these three separate hospitals under a single board of management.

The three hospitals will eventually transfer their operations to the new children's hospital, an as-yet unnamed tertiary children's hospital that is currently under construction on the campus of St. James's Hospital in Dublin.

Other planned CHI centres include:
Children's Health Ireland at Connolly, an outpatients' and urgent care centre (colocated with Connolly Hospital)
Children's Health Ireland at Tallaght, an outpatients' and urgent care centre (colocated with Tallaght University Hospital)

The name will be extended outside of Dublin throughout Ireland on a phased basis.

References

Medical and health organisations based in the Republic of Ireland